Ben Ahmed (Moroccan Arabic: بن أحمد) is a town in Settat Province, Casablanca-Settat, Morocco. According to the 2004 census it has a population of 21,361.

References

Populated places in Settat Province
Municipalities of Morocco